Thomas H. Jordan is an American seismologist, and former director (2002-2017) of the Southern California Earthquake Center at The University of Southern California. He was formerly the head of the Earth, Atmospheric and Planetary Sciences Department at the Massachusetts Institute of Technology and is a member of the National Academy of Sciences, the American Academy of Arts and Sciences, and the American Philosophical Society.

Research
Jordan has made significant contributions to plate tectonics concerning the structure of continents, the depth of lithospheric slab penetration, and the nature of mantle convection, for example determining the exact nature and processes involved in plate subduction. Jordan has also pioneered many seismic imaging techniques which he developed for his doctoral dissertation and are now used widely to understand the interior of the earth. Jordan has served on international committees concerning seismic hazard.

Awards
In 2017, Jordan was nominated and selected to receive the Bowie Medal, one of the highest honors the American Geophysical Union awards its members. However, AGU rescinded the medal following receipt of a formal ethics complaint and corresponding investigation. The AGU board reaffirmed its decision following an appeal.

Publications
He has been published extensively in scientific journals. He has also published two textbooks, "Understanding Earth" and "The Essential Earth".

References

Living people
American geophysicists
Massachusetts Institute of Technology people
University of Southern California people
California Institute of Technology alumni
University of Southern California faculty
Southern California Earthquake Center
Members of the United States National Academy of Sciences
Fellows of the American Geophysical Union
Year of birth missing (living people)
Members of the American Philosophical Society